Bonnie Carroll is an American widow who is the president and founder of the Tragedy Assistance Program for Survivors (TAPS), an organization that provides care, welfare and support to people who have lost a loved one in military service. She is the surviving spouse of Army Brig. Gen. Tom Carroll who died in an Army C-12 crash on November 12, 1992. In 2015 she was awarded the Presidential Medal of Freedom.

Education 
Carroll obtained a bachelor's degree in Public Administration, Political Science from the American University in 1988. In 2003, she also obtained a Diploma in International Relations and Conflict Resolution from the John F. Kennedy School of Government, Harvard University.

Military and national service 
Carroll served as the Transportation Officer, Logistics Officer, and Executive Officer in the Air National Guard for 16 years, she also served as the Chief, Casualty Operations, HQ USAF and also in the Pentagon with the USAF National Security and Emergency Preparedness staff. Carroll was appointed as White House Liaison for the Department of Veterans Affairs (VA).

Carroll served with two POTUS: as liaison for President Ronald Reagan with his Cabinet, where she coordinated domestic and economic policies, she also served with President George H. W. Bush in his Counsel's Office, where she assisted the legal review process for Presidential nominees to the Cabinet.

Carroll has also served with the Ministry of Communications in Iraq as the Deputy Senior Advisor for Programs where she modernized postal service and improved the media and telecommunications capacity in Iraq.

Tragedy Assistance Program for Survivors (TAPS)

Death of husband 
On November 12, 1992, Brig. Gen. Tom Carroll, 44, who was the assistant adjutant general of the Alaska Army Guard at the time, was making a routine flight to a facility in Juneau from Elmendorf Air Force Base in Anchorage in an Army C-12F twin-engine Beechcraft along with seven others. The guard were preparing for an instrument-aided landing when the plane crashed on southern Chilkat Peninsula. They died shortly after the crash.

Tom Carroll was a member of the national advisory board of the Salvation Army. His father Thomas P. Carroll, served as Alaska's first National Guard adjutant general, and was also killed in a plane crash in 1964.

Organization of TAPS 
In 1994, Carroll founded TAPS, a non-profit organization that provides care, welfare and comfort to those who have lost a relative or loved ones in the military. The organization's goal is to provide comfort, care and resources to all those grieving the death of a military loved one through a national peer support network and connection to grief resources, at no cost to surviving families and loved ones. Annually, since 1994, each Memorial Day weekend, TAPS organizes the National Military Survivor Seminar and Good Grief Camp in Washington, D.C. They also organize regional seminars for survivors of all ages across the United States.

Awards and recognition 
In November 2015, Barack Obama awarded Carroll with Presidential Medal of Freedom. In Obama's words, "even by the standards of Medal of Freedom recipients, this is a class act. We are just reminded when we see these individuals here on the stage what an incredible tapestry this country is."

Carroll was also a recipient of the Veterans of Foreign Wars' James E. Van Zandt Citizenship Award (2017) and the Robert M. Yerkes Award (2017) awarded by the American Psychological Association, and in 2019, she was awarded the Angel of Honor Award by the Armed Service YMCA.

Publications 
 Healing Your Grieving Heart After a Military Death: 100 Practical Ideas for Family and Friends (co-authored with Alan D. Wolfelt, PhD.), Companion Press (2015)

References 

Year of birth missing (living people)
Living people
Presidential Medal of Freedom recipients
Harvard Kennedy School alumni
American University alumni